McPhillips is a provincial electoral district (riding) in the Canadian province of Manitoba that came into effect at the 2019 Manitoba general election. It elects one member to the Legislative Assembly of Manitoba.

The riding was created by the 2018 provincial electoral redistribution out of parts of St. Paul, The Maples and Kildonan.

The riding contains the Rural Municipality of West St. Paul and the Winnipeg neighbourhoods of Garden City, Leila North, Templeton-Sinclair, Margaret Park, and a small part of Robertson.

The riding is apparently named for Winnipeg Route 180 (locally called McPhillips Street), a major thoroughfare that links the Winnipeg and West St. Paul parts of the riding.

Election results

^ Manitoba First change compared to Manitoba Party.

References

Manitoba provincial electoral districts
Politics of Winnipeg